The Moscow Formation is a geologic formation in New York. It preserves fossils dating back to the Givetian stage. It represents around 1.5–2 million years of constant deposition.

See also

 List of fossiliferous stratigraphic units in New York

References
 

Devonian geology of New York (state)
Devonian southern paleotemperate deposits